Matemwe is a village on the north-eastern coast of Unguja, the main island of the Zanzibar Archipelago, between Mwangaseni and Kigomani. Its economy is mostly based on seaweed farming and fishing. The village is the seat of an education project aimed at providing computer literacy to the population of the area, as well as the Dada (in swahili: "sister") cooperative that is intended to create job opportunities for Zanzibari women involving them in the processing and preparation of handmade cosmetics and food products such as jam, mustard and sweets that are sold in Stone Town.

There is a charity school in Matemwe, Tamani Foundation, which provides the local students with great education. The facilities includes a nursery school, the only one in Matemwe, and an adult education, where English, Math and Computer skills are being taught.

The main purpose of coming to Matemwe is the beach, which is the longest beach in Zanzibar. The beach is affected by the tide, so check tide schedules before visiting the beach. If you are staying there, however, that is not a problem as the tide is high two times every 24 hours. The beach is very quiet and you will not be harassed by many papasis (beach boys).

Internationally, Matemwe is especially known for its relatively unspoiled white sand beaches with few and expensive touristic structures, which makes for an exclusive vacation destination. The village is fronted by a lagoon and coral reef, as well as the small atoll of Mnemba, which is a particularly appreciated place for snorkeling and scuba diving. Fish species that can be easily spotted in the area include giant trevallies, trumpetfishes, anthiases, groupers and snappers.

References

Populated places in Zanzibar